Matalo! (also spelled as Mátalo) is a 1970 Italian Spaghetti Western film directed by Cesare Canevari.

The film is considered among the most original western ever produced in Italy. It is characterized from a greater weight given to psychology over action, an almost total lack of dialogues, an innovative soundtrack and the use by the lead character of a boomerang as his only weapon.

It was shown as part of a retrospective on Spaghetti Western at the 64th Venice International Film Festival.

Cast 
Corrado Pani: Burt
Lou Castel: Ray, the stranger
Antonio Salines: Theo
Claudia Gravy: Mary
Ana María Noé: Constance Benson
Luis Dávila: Phil
Diana Sorel

References

External links

1970 films
Spaghetti Western films
1970 Western (genre) films
Films directed by Cesare Canevari
Films set in ghost towns
Films shot in Almería
1970s Italian films